The Texas rat snake (Pantherophis obsoletus lindheimeri) is a subspecies of the black rat snake, a nonvenomous colubrid. It is found in the United States, primarily within the state of Texas, but its range extends into Louisiana, Arkansas and Oklahoma. It intergrades with other subspecies of Elaphe obsoleta, so exact range boundaries are impossible to distinguish. The epithet lindheimeri is to honor the German-American naturalist Ferdinand Jacob Lindheimer, who collected the first specimen in New Braunfels, Texas.

Description
The Texas rat snake is a medium to large snake, capable of attaining lengths of 4-5 ft. They vary greatly in color and patterning throughout their range, but they are typically yellow or tan, with brown to olive-green, irregular blotching from head to tail. Specimens from the southern area of their range tend to have more yellow, while those from the northern range tend to be darker. One way to distinguish them from other rat snakes is they are the only ones with a solid grey head. Some specimens have red or orange speckling. The belly is typically a solid gray or white in color. The several naturally occurring color variations include albinos, high orange or hypomelanistic, and a few specimens which display leucism, which have become regularly captive-bred and are popular in the pet trade. The Texas rat snake becomes very black with white spots in some specimens caught in Sabine County, Texas, which reflects the northern intergrade of the black rat snake.

Behavior
Texas rat snakes are relatively timid for such a large snake, but they are extremely variable in temperament. Adults can be mild-tempered – exhibiting mouth gaping and biting when approached. Juveniles less than a year old may either be very docile or bite when disturbed.  One of their defensive behaviors involves 'rattling' or rapidly whipping the end of their tails back and forth against anything nearby to create a rattling sound. They also have an awful-smelling musk compared to other snakes. They eat readily in captivity and will eat thawed frozen mice and rats. Wild-caught specimens generally eventually become docile in captivity.

Diet
The Texas rat snake has a voracious appetite, consuming large numbers of rodents and birds, and sometimes lizards, soft-bodied insects, and frogs, which they subdue with constriction. They are generalists, found in a wide range of habitats from swamps to forests to grasslands, even in urban areas. They are agile climbers, able to reach bird nests with relative ease. They are often found around farmland, and sometimes consume fledgling chickens and eggs, which leads them to be erroneously called the chicken snake.

Taxonomy
All North American rat snake species have been suggested for reclassification to the genus Pantherophis. A further revision of Pantherophis obsoletus has recommended the elimination of the various subspecies entirely, considering them all to be merely locality variations.  However, the ICZN has rejected the renaming, thus Elaphe remains the generally accepted generic name.

Gallery

References

Further reading
Baird SF, Girard CF (1853). Catalogue of North American Reptiles in the Museum of the Smithsonian Institution. Part I.—Serpents. Washington, District of Columbia: Smithsonian Institution. xvi + 172 pp. (Scotophis lindheimerii, new species, pp. 74–75).
Behler JL, King FW (1979). The Audubon Society Field Guide to North American Reptiles and Amphibians. New York: Alfred A. Knopf. 743 pp. . (Elaphe obsoleta lindheimeri, p. 606).
Conant R (1975). A Field Guide to Reptiles and Amphibians of Eastern and Central North America, Second Edition. Boston: Houghton Mifflin Company. xviii + 429 pp. + Plates 1-48.  (hardcover),  (paperback). (Elaphe obsoleta lindheimeri, p. 196 + Plate 28 + Map 149).
Smith HM, Brodie ED Jr (1982). Reptiles of North America: A Guide to Field Identification. New York: Golden Press. 240 pp. . (Elaphe obsoleta lindheimeri, p. 184).
Stejneger L, Barbour T (1917). A Check List of North American Amphibians and Reptiles. Cambridge, Massachusetts: Harvard University Press. iv + 125 pp. (Elaphe obsoleta lindheimerii, p. 83).
Wright AH, Wright AA (1957). Handbook of Snakes of the United States and Canada. Ithaca and London: Comstock Publishing Associates, a Division of Cornell University Press. 1,105 pp. (in 2 volumes). (Elaphe obsoleta lindheimeri, pp. 239–243, Figure 74 + Map 24 on p. 235).

Rat snakes
Reptiles of the United States
Fauna of the Plains-Midwest (United States)
http://reptile-database.reptarium.cz/species?genus=Pantherophis&species=obsoletus